Cheating at Solitaire is the first solo album from Social Distortion frontman Mike Ness. Released in 1999, it bypasses much of Social Distortion's punk muscle in favor of a more roots-oriented approach to rock and roll. It features cameos by Bruce Springsteen, Brian Setzer, and members of Royal Crown Revue. Johnny Cash was invited to perform on the song "Ballad of a Lonely Man", but was too ill to record at the time.

"Dope Fiend Blues" and "I'm In Love w/My Car" were originally written/recorded in 1994 as a demo of Social Distortion's fifth album White Light, White Heat, White Trash. Ness also originally wrote some of the songs on this album around 1997 while Social Distortion was planning their sixth album.

Track listing 
 All songs by Mike Ness unless otherwise noted.

 "The Devil in Miss Jones" – 3:49
 "Don't Think Twice" (Bob Dylan) – 3:47
 "Misery Loves Company" – 3:47
 "Crime Don't Pay" – 3:31
 "Rest of Our Lives" – 3:44
 "You Win Again" (Hank Williams) – 3:11
 "Cheating at Solitaire" – 3:53
 "No Man's Friend" – 4:57
 "Charmed Life" – 3:38
 "Dope Fiend Blues" – 5:17
 "Ballad of a Lonely Man" – 3:25
 "I'm in Love w/My Car" – 4:41
 "If You Leave Before Me" – 4:19
 "Long Black Veil" (Danny Dill, Marijohn Wilkin) – 4:04
 "Send Her Back" (Al Ferrier) – 2:57
 "Company C" – 5:03 (Bonus song on Vinyl Version)

Personnel 

 Bob Breen – assistant engineer
 Jolie Clemens – artwork
 Tom Corbett – mandolin
 Mando Dorame – tenor saxophone
 Paul Ericksen – assistant engineer
 Josh Freese – drums, snare drums
 Daniel Glass – drums, snare drums
 Martin Klemm – mixing assistant
 Chris Lawrence – guitar, pedal steel
 Veikko Lepisto – electric bass, upright bass
 Jamie Muhoberac – keyboards, Hammond organ
 Mike Ness – acoustic guitar, guitar, vocals, producer, artwork, mixing
 James Saez – acoustic guitar, guitar, percussion, keyboards, producer, engineer, slide guitar, mixing
 F. Scott Schafer – photography
 Eddy Schreyer – mastering
 Brian Setzer – guitar (on "Crime Don't Pay")
 Bruce Springsteen – guitar, vocals (on "Misery Loves Company")
 Billy Zoom – guitar (on "Dope Fiend Blues")

Charts 
 Peak position: The Billboard 200 #80 on May 1, 1999

References 

Mike Ness albums
1999 debut albums
Time Bomb Recordings albums